Moments is the third studio album by Norwegian pop duo Marcus & Martinus. The album was released by Sony Music Entertainment on 17 November 2017 and peaked at number 1 on both the Norwegian VG-lista albums chart and the Swedish Sverigetopplistan albums chart.

Singles
"Like It Like It" was released as the lead single from the album on 19 May 2017. The song has peaked at number 16 on the Norwegian Singles Chart and number 48 on the Swedish Singles Chart. "First Kiss" was released as the second single from the album on 23 June 2017. The song has peaked at number 15 on the Norwegian Singles Chart and number 52 on the Swedish Singles Chart. "Dance with You" was released as the third single from the album on 28 July 2017. The song has peaked at number 40 on the Norwegian Singles Chart and number 48 on the Swedish Singles Chart. "Make You Believe in Love" was released as the fourth single from the album on 29 September 2017. The song has peaked at number 34 on the Norwegian Singles Chart and number 47 on the Swedish Singles Chart. "One Flight Away" was released as the fifth single from the album on 3 November 2017. The song has peaked at number 20 on the Norwegian Singles Chart and number 79 on the Swedish Singles Chart. "Never" was released as the sixth single from the album on 15 November 2017. "Remind Me" was released as the seventh single from the album on 26 January 2018. The song has peaked at number 40 on the Norwegian Singles Chart and number 63 on the Swedish Singles Chart.

Track listing

Charts

Release history

References

2017 albums